Gunung Putri Station is an inactive railway station located in Gunung Putri, Bogor Regency, West Java, Indonesia. The station is located at an elevation of +115 m. It is included in the Jakarta Operation Area I.

The origins of the construction of this station can be traced to the master plan for the construction of the Jakarta Outer Ring Railway line made by the Ministry of Transportation of the Republic of Indonesia in the early 1990s. The goal is that freight trains do not enter the Special Capital Region of Jakarta area. The route is from Parung Panjang Station to Cikarang Station. However, the 1997 Asian financial crisis caused the plan to stop halfway, so the rail line only reached Nambo station. To fill this empty route slot, the Nambo diesel multiple unit ( or KRD) line was operated from 1999 to 2006. In 2006, the KRD line stopped operating because the DMUs was old and unfit for operation. Automatically, all stations and tracks were also deactivated.

Although not servicing passengers, there is a spontaneous market (Pasar Kaget) located right above the station. It opens every Friday. Since 2013, the Nambo Line has begun to be activated for cement transport trains, but the KRL Commuter Line has only existed since 2015. Even though currently there is a Commuterline service to Nambo Station, the Gunung Putri station has not yet been activated. The shock market in the station yard still exists even though the KRL is operating normally.

References

Bogor Regency
Railway stations in West Java
Defunct railway stations in Indonesia
Railway stations opened in 1997
Railway stations closed in 2006